Snoopy Presents: For Auld Lang Syne, or simply For Auld Lang Syne, is a 2021 Peanuts animated special. It is the first Peanuts special produced for Apple TV+, the first Peanuts special since Happiness Is a Warm Blanket, Charlie Brown ten years prior, and the first Peanuts holiday special since I Want a Dog for Christmas, Charlie Brown eighteen years prior. The special was released exclusively on Apple TV+ on December 10, 2021. It was nominated for Best Animated Special Production at the 49th Annie Awards.

Plot
On the first week of December, Lucy begins Christmas preparations for the arrival of her grandmother, whom she loves dearly. Meanwhile, Charlie Brown tries to finish his New Year's resolutions, which in typical fashion, he fails to do any of. Lucy compacts them to two specific ones: build a snowman (which he immediately fails at) and do something "remotely" creative. Elsewhere, Snoopy celebrates the arrival of his siblings. Spike, only having a childhood photo of him and the others, tries to take a new current photo, but is constantly stymied by bad luck.

On Christmas Eve, Lucy is distraught to learn that her grandmother is not coming this year (her reason is unknown) and solemnly worries that she is unloved. In an effort to feel better, she decides to throw a New Year's Eve party at an old abandoned theater, which she manages to rent with the numerous nickels Charlie Brown has paid her over the years. She invites everyone and has Charlie Brown be in charge of decorations with the other kids also helping out. Snoopy's family gets invited to play at the party; however, when Spike's camera is accidentally destroyed, Spike decides to leave, saddening the dogs.

The party does not go the way Lucy wants, as everyone finds her rules boring. Soon everyone becomes miserable as Lucy tries to get Linus to save the party, but he instead snaps back at Lucy for trying to make it about herself instead of her friends. As everyone leaves, Charlie Brown accidentally knocks down the decorations, essentially failing his second resolution. Snoopy and his siblings find Spike at the bus stop afterwards and apologize for what happened before. As Lucy misses the New Year hour, Charlie Brown meets with Linus and learns why Lucy was upset to begin with, empathizing with her.

Linus finds Lucy in her bedroom and reminds her that he loves her no matter what. Charlie Brown arrives to give words of encouragement and reveals that he brought everyone from the party after explaining the situation. Everyone pretends to restart the countdown as Lucy finally has a party that satisfies everyone, Franklin takes a good photo of Snoopy and his siblings together and Lucy helps Charlie Brown with another New Year's resolution by immediately crossing it off: Being a good friend.

Cast 

 Etienne Kellici as Charlie Brown
 Terry McGurrin as Snoopy
 Rob Tinkler as Woodstock, Spike, and Olaf
 Lexi Perri as Peppermint Patty
 Isabella Leo as Lucy
 Wyatt White as Linus
 Hattie Kragten as Sally
 Holly Gorski as Marcie
 Caleb Bellavance as Franklin
 Natasha Nathan as Patty
 Charlie Boyle as Violet
 Jacob Soley as Pigpen
 Matthew Mucci as Schroeder
 Jackson Reid as Thibault and Maynard
 Will Bhaneja as Shermy
 Jacob Mazeral as José Peterson
 Lucas Nguyen as Floyd
 Katie Griffin as Belle
 Mark Edwards as Andy
 Cory Doran as Marbles
 Harley Ruznisky as Tapioca Pudding
 Maya Misaljevic as Frieda

Production 
On October 19, 2020, Apple had signed a deal to acquire the streaming rights to the Peanuts holiday specials for Apple TV+, including orders for new specials to be produced for the service. On October 4, 2021, Apple had announced the release date and title for the special, with the trailer following on November 29.

Reception 
The special was well received by critics and fans. Common Sense Media rated the film 4 out of 5, adding: "Peanuts New Year's movie is cute but not iconic." Joel Keller from Decider.com also rated it highly, saying, "Shifting the perspective to the usually confident Lucy, and showing a moment where she has a lack of confidence, is refreshing and welcome." Chuck Wilson from The Village Voice also praised the special, saying, "Kaytis and co-writers Alex Galatis and Scott Montgomery transform Lucy from a character of nostalgia into a girl as self-reflective and searching as any young person watching the special might be. Her crisis of self is sure to resonate, and that’s a triumph not only for Kaytis and company but for the late Charles Schulz, who gave his characters the gifts of grace and intelligence but also melancholy and doubt."

Accolades 
The special was nominated at the 49th Annie Awards for Best Animated Special Production.

References

External links
 
 

Peanuts television specials
New Year's television specials
Films directed by Clay Kaytis